São Vicente Ferrer may refer to:

The Portuguese name of Saint Vincent Ferrer
São Vicente Ferrer, Maranhão, a parish in Brazil
São Vicente Ferrer, Pernambuco, a parish in Brazil